Fire from the Heartland: The Awakening of the Conservative Woman is a 2010 American documentary film written and directed by former Breitbart News LLC executive chairman Steve Bannon, and produced by David N. Bossie for Citizens United Productions. The documentary stars Michele Bachmann, Deneen Borelli, and Ann Coulter, and focuses on female participation in conservative politics.

Background
Bannon was inspired to create the documentary after seeing former Alaskan governor Sarah Palin run as John McCain's vice president running mate in the 2008 United States presidential election.  In exploring the Tea Party movement, the film interviews only women. The sole male voice heard in the film is from a clip of an on-air rant by CNBC's Rick Santelli from a February 2009 broadcast.

Synopsis
The documentary looks at the idea of the conservative political female in the United States and how they have impacted and been impacted by the Tea Party movement. Bannon interviews women from different socioeconomic backgrounds and how this has had an effect on their outlook on life and in politics, as well as what they believe what the future will bring and their opinions on how conservative politics and the Tea Party is portrayed in the media.

Cast

Michele Bachmann
Deneen Borelli
Ann Coulter
S. E. Cupp
Dana Loesch
Cynthia Lummis
Jenny Beth Martin
Michelle Malkin
Jamie Radtke
Phyllis Schlafly
Jean Schmidt
Janine Turner

Reception

Tina Nguyen, writing in Vanity Fair, referred to the film as propaganda by Bannon.

References

External links

 
 

American documentary films
American propaganda films
Citizens United Productions films
Documentary films about women
Tea Party movement
Films directed by Steve Bannon
2010s English-language films
2010s American films